Astrantia maxima, (largest masterwort), is a species of flowering plant in the family Apiaceae.

It is hardy to USDA Zone: 4-9.
It has gained the Royal Horticultural Society's Award of Garden Merit.

Description
Astrantia maxima reaches on average  of height. The stem is erect and glabrous, with little branches and few leaves. The basal leaves have a long petiole , 3 to 7 lobes and toothed segments. Size: . The cauline (borne on the stem as opposed to basal) leaves are generally two, sessile, amplexicaul and lanceolate-shaped with a trilobed apex. The inflorescence is umbrella-shaped,  in diameter. The small flowers are pinkish-white. The central ones are hermaphrodite, while the external ones are male. The flowering period extends from May to July.

Reproduction
Astrantia maxima is an entomophilous plant, mainly pollinated by beetles, but also by other insects. This perennial plant reproduces itself also by means of buds present at the ground level.
The plant can also be grown from seed for garden usage. The seeds require a 2-3 month period of cold stratification for germination to take place.

Taxonomy
It was found by botanist Peter Simon Pallas in 1790. It was first published and described by Pallas in 'Nova Acta Acad. Sci. Imp. Petrop. Hist. Acad.' Vol.7 on page 357 in 1793.

It was also previously known as the 'hellebore-leaved masterwort'.

Etymology
The specific epithet maxima, meaning "largest",  distinguishes this species from its smaller relatives Astrantia minor and Astrantia major.

Distribution and habitat
These plants, native to Europe, are widespread in the Caucasus. They have been grown in the British Isles since 1804.

Also common in Turkey is the subspecies Astrantia maxima Pallas subsp. haradjianii.

Cultivation
Astrantia maxima grows well in the garden, given some shade and moisture. Its flowerheads provide summer colour in shades of red, pink and white. It is also rabbit resistant. It is rated for hardiness, USDA zones 5 to 9.

Cultivars
 Astrantia major 'Hadspen Blood' is a hybrid of Astrantia major and A. maxima.
 Astrantia maxima 'Mark Fenwick', listed on some nurseries and recently onto the RHS Catalogue.
 Astrantia maxima 'Rosea', listed on some nurseries but not on RHS Catalogue.

References

Apioideae
Flora of Europe
Plants described in 1793